Teemu Aleksi Lehtilä (born 27 November 1966, in Kokemäki) is a Finnish actor. He studied in the Department of Acting at the University of Tampere and graduated in 1990. He has acted in the Municipal Theatre of Jyväskylä and Tampere Theatre (including the role of Romeo in Shakespeare's Romeo and Juliet) as well as for television, where he is best known as narcissist and antagonist Aaro Vaalanne in the Finnish soap opera Salatut elämät. He acted in Salatut elämät during the production period 2004–2006 and returned to the series from spring 2007 to summer 2009, when he also played the character of Eero Vanala, Aaro's twin brother, as well as the role of Eero and Aaro's father.

Filmography

Films 
Esa ja Vesa – auringonlaskun ratsastajat (1994)
Häjyt (1999)
Young Love (2001)
Niin lähellä, niin kaukana (2003)
Vares 2 - Jäätynyt Enkeli (2007)

Television series 
Trabant Express (1997)
Metsolat (1995)
Samppanjaa ja vaahtokarkkeja (1995)
Pimeän hehku (1996)
Elämän suola (1997–1998)
Tumma ja hehkuva veri (1998)
Tuliportaat (1998)
Klubi (1998–1999)
Äkkiä Anttolassa (1999)
Kirjava silta (2000)
Hovimäki (2003)
Salatut elämät (Aaro Vaalanne, 2004–2006, 2007, 2009, 2012, 2015, 2017–), (Eero Vanala, 2007–2009), (Aaro's and Eero's father), 2009)
Kotikatu (2010)
Pirunpelto (2013)
Korpelan kujanjuoksu (2016)

References

External links

 

Finnish male film actors
1966 births
Living people
People from Kokemäki
Finnish male television actors
Finnish male stage actors
University of Tampere alumni
Male soap opera actors